The  is the main line of Japanese private railway operator Odakyu Electric Railway. It extends 82.5 km from Shinjuku in central Tokyo through the southwest suburbs to the city of Odawara, the gateway to Hakone in Kanagawa Prefecture. It is a busy commuter line and is also known for its "Romancecar" limited express services. From Yoyogi-Uehara Station some trains continue onto the Tokyo Metro Chiyoda Line and beyond to the East Japan Railway Company Joban Line.

Operation
Destinations are from Shinjuku unless noted. English abbreviations are tentative for this article.

 
Collectively known as "Romancecar" services, there is an extra seat charge for limited express service.
  (RE)
No extra charge.
  (E)
  (SE)
Most services run through on the Chiyoda and Joban Lines.
 
  (CE)
All services operate in the weekday morning for Shinjuku from Karakida on the Odakyu Tama Line.
  (CS)
All services operate from Hon-Atsugi to the Chiyoda Line during weekday mornings.

Stations 
Notes:
 See the Romancecar article for information on Odakyu Romancecar limited express services.
 Local trains stop at every station.

Legend:
 ● - all trains stop at this station; ■ - some trains stop at this station;｜- all trains pass
 "CS" - Commuter Semi Express; "CE" - Commuter Express "SE" - Semi-Express; "E" - Express; "RE" - Rapid Express

History
The Odawara Express Railway Co. opened the entire line on April 1, 1927 in order to allow for the Emperor's family to travel on the line, though as duplication works were not completed until October that year, there was initial timetable and signalling issues. Although primarily intended as a passenger line, gravel began to be hauled in 1930.

In 1942, the company was forcibly merged by the government with Tokyu Corporation and the line was named the Tokyu Odawara Line. Tokyu was broken up in 1948 and the line was transferred to the newly founded Odakyu Electric Railway Co.

A connecting track was laid in 1955 to Matsuda Station on the Gotemba Line of the (then) Japanese National Railways, and limited express service through to the line started. To function as a bypass to central Tokyo, through service on the Eidan Subway (now Tokyo Metro) Chiyoda Line commenced in 1978 via Yoyogi-Uehara.

Increasing traffic volume since the 1970s led to plans being formed in 1985 for a track upgrading project on the Odawara Line, though land acquisition issues stalled major track expansion work until construction began in 2013; the project is being carried out between Yoyogi-Uehara and Mukōgaoka-Yūen, quadrupling the Odawara Line trackage and stacking the tracks underground, allowing for increased express services. Originally a viaduct was planned but this was changed to underground tracks, and work on the tunnel between Setagaya-Daita and Higashi-Kitazawa was completed in 2018.

Former connecting lines

See also
 List of railway lines in Japan

References
This article incorporates material from the corresponding article in the Japanese Wikipedia

External links

 Official site 
 Official site 
 Route map with English transliteration

Odawara Line
Railway lines in Tokyo
Railway lines in Kanagawa Prefecture
1067 mm gauge railways in Japan
Railway lines opened in 1927
1927 establishments in Japan